Caroline Humfress, FRHS, FSLS, is a legal historian who is professor at the University of St Andrews and Director of its Institute of Legal and Constitutional Research.

Early life and education
Caroline Humfress received her advanced education at the University of Cambridge from where she earned her BA, MA, and PhD, the last for a thesis titled Forensic practice in the development of Roman law and ecclesiastical law in late antiquity, with special reference to the prosecution of heresy (1999).

Career
Humfress held a Junior Research Fellowship at Queens' College, Cambridge before being appointed the "Carlyle Research Fellow in the History of Political Thought" at the University of Oxford and Research Fellow at St Catherine's College. She was Assistant Professor in Rhetoric and Law at the University of California, Berkeley, from 2000-05 before moving to Birkbeck College, University of London where she worked for eleven years (becoming professor of history in 2014). In July 2015 she was appointed professor of medieval history and deputy director of the University of St Andrews Institute of Legal and Constitutional Research. In 2019/20 she became Director of the Institute of Legal and Constitutional Research. She is a fellow of the Royal Historical Society and the Society of Legal Scholars.

Selected publications
'A New Legal Cosmos: Late Roman Lawyers and the Early Medieval Church', The Medieval World, Linehan, P., Nelson, J. L. & Costambeys, M. (eds.) (London: Routledge, 2018)

References

External links 
Justinian's Legal Code (extended podcast version), In Our Time, Humfress on the panel with Simon Corcoran and Paul du Plessis, 2016.
Gnosticism, In Our Time, Humfress on the panel with Martin Palmer and Alastair Logan, 2013.
The Pelagian Controversy, In Our Time, Humfress on the panel with Martin Palmer and John Milbank, 2011.
The Nicene Creed, In Our Time, Humfress on the panel with Andrew Louth and Martin Palmer, 2007.

Living people
Academics of Birkbeck, University of London
Legal historians
Academics of the University of St Andrews
Alumni of the University of Cambridge
Fellows of the Royal Historical Society
British women historians
Women legal scholars
Fellows of Queens' College, Cambridge
Year of birth missing (living people)